10/7 may refer to:
October 7 (month-day date notation)
July 10 (day-month date notation)
10 shillings and 7 pence in UK predecimal currency

See also
 107 (disambiguation)
 7/10 (disambiguation)